M-Day may refer to:

 M-Day (book), a history book by Viktor Suvorov
 Decimation (comics), an event in the fictional Marvel Universe
 M-day, the day on which mobilization commences; see Military designation of days and hours
 Mobilization Day, the day Canadian police would arrest suspected communists under the secret PROFUNC program